52nd National Board of Review Awards
January 26, 1981
The 52nd National Board of Review Awards were announced on December 18, 1980, and given on January 26, 1981.

Top Ten Films 
Ordinary People
Raging Bull
Coal Miner's Daughter
Tess
Melvin and Howard
The Great Santini
The Elephant Man
The Stunt Man
My Bodyguard
Resurrection

Top Foreign Films 
The Tin Drum
Kagemusha
Knife in the Head
From the Life of the Marionettes
Eboli

Winners 
Best Film: Ordinary People
Best Foreign Film: The Tin Drum
Best Actor: Robert De Niro (Raging Bull)
Best Actress: Sissy Spacek (Coal Miner's Daughter)
Best Supporting Actor: Joe Pesci (Raging Bull)
Best Supporting Actress: Eva Le Gallienne (Resurrection)
Best Director: Robert Redford (Ordinary People)
Career Achievement Award: Gloria Swanson

External links 
National Board of Review of Motion Pictures :: Awards for 1980

1980
1980 film awards
1980 in American cinema